Andrew Joseph Francis Brown  (3 October 1907 – 23 August 1986) was a New Zealand mechanic, entrepreneur, entertainment promoter, businessman and racehorse owner. He was born in Naseby, in the Maniototo, New Zealand on 3 October 1907.

In the 1970 New Year Honours, Brown was awarded the British Empire Medal for services to the community as an entertainment promoter.

References

1907 births
1986 deaths
20th-century New Zealand businesspeople
People from Naseby, New Zealand
New Zealand recipients of the British Empire Medal